The Church of Our Lady of Sorrows (Spanish: Nuestra Señora de los Dolores) is a Roman Catholic parish church in the Roman Catholic Archdiocese of New York, located at 105 Pitt Street between Rivington Street and Stanton Street in the Lower East Side of Manhattan in New York City. The area formerly served Catholics who lived in the immigrant enclave of Kleindeutschland (Little Germany).

History
The Church of Our Lady of Sorrows was established in 1867 as Our Lady of the Seven Dolors Church and staffed by the Capuchin Friars. It served as the national parish for the large number of German Catholics who immigrated to New York in the late nineteenth century. Later it became a parish for Italian and then Hispanic immigrants.

Building
Our Lady of Sorrows was built 1867–1868 in the Victorian, Byzantine Revival, and Romanesque Revival style by Henry Engelbert. Archbishop John McCloskey dedicated the church on September 6, 1868.

School
The parish school was among 27 closed by the Archdiocese under the Archbishop Timothy M. Dolan in January 2011.

References 

1867 establishments in New York (state)
19th-century Roman Catholic church buildings in the United States
Byzantine Revival architecture in New York City
Henry Engelbert church buildings
Lower East Side
National parishes
Religious organizations established in 1867
Roman Catholic churches completed in 1867
Roman Catholic churches in Manhattan
Romanesque Revival church buildings in New York City
Victorian architecture in New York City